Santa Ana is a municipality in the Honduran department of La Paz, known for its high crime rate.

Demographics
At the time of the 2013 Honduras census, Santa Ana municipality had a population of 11,777. Of these, 95.56% were Indigenous (95.46% Lenca), 4.25% Mestizo, 0.13% Black or Afro-Honduran and 0.06% others.

References

Municipalities of the La Paz Department (Honduras)